Brighton Lifeboat Station is a Royal National Lifeboat Institution (RNLI) station located in the town of Brighton in the English county of East Sussex in the United Kingdom. It was originally established in 1825 as an all-weather lifeboat station. This lifeboat was withdrawn in 1931, and the station now operates as an inshore lifeboat station. , the current lifeboat is the Atlantic 85 RNLB Random Harvest (ON 852).

Location 
The station is located in the marina area of Brighton and is co-ordinated from HM Coastguards at Lee-on-Solent. Being an inshore station, the majority of the station's services are within two miles of the station. The station is called to an average of sixty rescues a year.

History 
The National Institution for the Preservation of Life from Shipwreck, the forerunner of the RNLI, first opened a lifeboat station in Brighton in 1824. The lifeboat for this station was kept in a cave close to the Chain Pier. The service operated from this cave until 1837, when the construction of the Madeira sea-wall and Madeira Drive was completed. At that time, the lifeboat was withdrawn from the town, and it was not until 1858 that another station was opened in Brighton.

1858–1931 
In 1858, the town council provided an area on the beach for a new boathouse opposite the Bedford Hotel close to the West Pier. The station was relocated twice in the next decades, once in 1868 and again in 1886 following improvements to the Brighton seafront. After 1886, the station was located on the Western Esplanade between the two piers. The site was used until 1931 when the RNLI withdrew the all-weather boat from the town after nearby Shoreham Station was equipped with a motor lifeboat.

1965 inshore lifeboat 
After 1931, Brighton had no lifeboats of its own until it received an inflatable D-class inshore lifeboat in 1965, funded from public donations. This lifeboat was withdrawn before the winter of 1974 and the station was closed in 1975. In 1978 the station re-opened at the new Brighton Marina where a pontoon was provided for the RNLI at the cost of £10,000. At that point the lifeboat was the Atlantic 21 Lions International (B 539), which did not become fully operational until 1979. In 1981 a permanent boathouse was constructed and a temporary shelter was installed on the nearby quayside to house the crew facilities. This new permanent station was the RNLI's first floating lifeboat station. In 1997 the station was provided with a larger Atlantic 75 lifeboat called Thelma Glossop (B 737). The new lifeboat arrived on the station on 1 July of that year.

1999 and 2014 improvements 

In 1999 work began on the construction of new shore facilities for the station on the quayside within the marina. The work was completed in 2000 at a cost of £299.775. In January 2014, the station's facilities were closed and the station moved to temporary accommodation nearby. The 2000 building was demolished as part of the £235 million re-development and expansion of the Brighton Marina.

Neighbouring Station Locations

References 

Lifeboat stations in East Sussex